Frank Sánchez may refer to:
 Frank Sánchez (lawyer), American lawyer, business advisor and government official
 Frank Sánchez (boxer), Cuban boxer